Leslie Wilson (3 January 1926 – 20 January 2006) was a British cyclist. He competed in the men's tandem event at the 1952 Summer Olympics.

References

1926 births
2006 deaths
English male cyclists
Olympic cyclists of Great Britain
Cyclists at the 1952 Summer Olympics
Sportspeople from Leeds